The Proceedings of the Academy of Natural Sciences of Philadelphia is a peer-reviewed scientific journal published by Academy of Natural Sciences of Drexel University since 1841.

References

External links

Publications established in 1841
Academic journals published in the United States
Drexel University